Fox 40 is a Canadian whistle manufacturer.

Fox 40 may also refer to:

Television stations in the United States affiliated with the Fox Broadcasting Company:
KTXL, Sacramento, California
WDBD, Jackson, Mississippi
WICZ-TV, Binghamton, New York